Natasha Woods (born 25 October 1999), known professionally as Dylan (stylised in all caps as DYLAN), is an English musician, singer and songwriter. She signed to Island Records in 2022 and released her debut mixtape The Greatest Thing I'll Never Learn in October 2022, which peaked at No. 19 on the UK Albums Chart.

Early life 
Woods was born in the village of Bures, England. She started playing music from a young age, learning the guitar from the age of 10. She was diagnosed with Irlen syndrome as a child, after struggling at school with reading. Woods learned to play piano and guitar by ear, and began to write songs. Woods sent some of her music to producer Will Hicks, who took an interest in her work.

Career

2019-present: early EPs and The Greatest Thing I'll Never Learn
Dylan released her debut EP named Purple in 2019. This was followed by two further EPs, Red in 2020 and No Romeo in 2022. 

In mid 2022, Dylan supported Ed Sheeran on his +–=÷× Tour. and was signed to Island Records.

On 28 October 2022, Dylan released the mixtape, The Greatest Thing I'll Never Learn. Dylan was named as Deezer's 'focus artist' shortly after. In December 2023, Dylan was also announced by BBC Radio 1 as a Sound of 2023.

Discography

Mixtapes

Extended plays

Singles

Tours

Headlining 
 The Greatest Thing I'll Never Learn Tour (2023; seventeen shows)

Supporting 
 Bastille - Give Me the Future Tour (2022; nine shows)
 Tate McRae - Europe Tour 2022 (2022; fifteen shows)
 Ed Sheeran - +–=÷x Tour (2022; twenty-six shows)

References 

Living people
1999 births
English women singer-songwriters
Musicians from London
Singers from London
Island Records artists
21st-century English women singers